Events in the year 1965 in Norway.

Incumbents
 Monarch – Olav V
 President of the Storting – 
 Prime Minister – Einar Gerhardsen (Labour Party)

From 12 October:
 Prime Minister – Per Borten (Centre Party)

Events
 4 February-1 April – the "Grenade Man", an unidentified person whom placed grenades and grenade traps in several places in Oslo, spreads fear in Oslo. The case remained unsolved despite the huge media coverage and public interest in the matter.
 13 September – The 1965 Parliamentary election takes place.
 12 October – Per Borten becomes Prime Minister of Norway
 12 October – Borten's Cabinet was appointed.
 Norsk Hydro joins Elf Aquitaine and six other French companies to form Petronord to perform search for oil and gas in the North Sea.

Popular culture

Sports

Music 

Kirsti Sparboe wins the Melodi Grand Prix, singing "Karusell" by Jolly Kramer-Johansen.

Film

Literature

Novels
Bergljot Hobæk Haff – Skjøgens bok
Alfred Hauge – Cleng Peerson: ankerfeste
Harald Sverdrup – Negeren og solsikken

Drama
Jens Bjørneboe – Til lykke med dagen

Poetry
Peter R. Holm – Øyeblikkets forvandlinger

Notable births

January 
 

2 January 
 Petter Bjørheim, politician.
 Torgeir Trældal, politician.
3 January – Sverre Istad, biathlete.
6 January 
 Marianne Dahlmo, cross-country skier.
 Inger Lise Hegge, cross-country skier.
9 January – Erling Aas-Eng, politician.
15 January 
 Karita Bekkemellem, politician.
 Marius Holst, film director.
18 January 
 Lasse Arnesen, alpine skier.
 Magne Johansen, ski jumper.
19 January – Mette Halvorsen, curler.
31 January – Christian Styren, diver.

February 
 

2 February – Morten Viskum, painter.
3 February – Terje Langli, cross-country skier.
4 February – Stig Henrik Hoff, actor.
13 February – Ole Mathisen, jazz musician.
15 February – Terje Aasland, politician.
17 February 
 Cathrin Bretzeg, politician.
 Øyvind Slåke, politician.
18 February – Aage Thor Falkanger, judge.
19 February – Arne Johan Almeland, sprint canoer.
26 February – Erik Bjørkum, sailor.
27 February – Beret Bråten, politician.

March 
 
 

1 March – Odd Henriksen, politician.
4 March – Wenche Lægraid, sprint canoer.
8 March – Frank Bakke-Jensen, politician.
10 March 
 Inge Ludvigsen, footballer.
 Tove Elise Madland, politician.
11 March 
 Hans Christian Holte, civil servant.
 Petter Salsten, ice hockey player.
13 March – Frode Granhus, crime fiction writer (died 2017).
14 March – Marita Fossum, writer.
23 March – Trine Haltvik, handball player.
24 March – Terje Breivik, politician.
25 March – Per Edmund Mordt, footballer.
31 March – Ragnhild Bente Andersen, orienteering competitor.

April 
 

8 April – Steinar Karlstrøm, politician.
15 April 
 Ole Christian Eidhammer, ski jumper.
 Lars Arvid Nilsen, shot putter.
17 April – Robert Stoltenberg, actor and comedian.
20 April – Ivan Enstad, rower.
24 April – Marit Reiersgård, crime writer.
30 April – Benedicte Bjørnland, jurist and civil servant.

May 

 

3 May – Stein Erik Lauvås, politician.
4 May – Marit Elveos, cross-country skier.
5 May – May Grethe Lerum, writer, journalist and literary critic.
6 May – Jan Tore Sanner, politician.
8 May – Hans Engelsen Eide, freestyle skier.
15 May – Geir Axelsen, economist and civil servant.
16 May 
 Thomas Gill, footballer.
 John Arne "Jason" Sæterøy, cartoonist.
21 May – Liv Kari Eskeland, politician.
23 May – Jon Inge Kjørum, ski jumper.
28 May – Stein Rønning, karateka (died 2008).
31 May – Ellen Alfsen, politician

June 
 
 

6 June 
 Erik Fosnes Hansen, writer.
 Roger Kjendalen, handball player.
9 June – Helge Sunde, composer and musician.
14 June – Siri Landsem, sport shooter.
16 June 
 Karl-Einar Jensen, sailor.
 Eirik Stubø, stage producer and theatre director.
17 June 
 Nina Lykke, writer.
 Linda Medalen, footballer. 
18 June – Anne Tingelstad Wøien, politician.
26 June – Rune Brynhildsen, businessperson

July 
 
2 July – Harald Zwart, film director
2 July – Fredrik Sejersted, jurist, and Attorney General of Norway.
4 July – Erik Johnsen, ski jumper.
8 July – Ingvil Smines Tybring-Gjedde, politician.
10 July – Paul Chaffey, politician.
16 July – Morten Høglund, politician.
24 July – Merete Morken Andersen, author, literature critic and editor
26 July – Håkon Wium Lie, Chief Technology Officer
27 July – Kari Raustein, politician.

August 
 
 

8 August – Tor Skeie, freestyle skier.
11 August 
 Gunnar Halle, footballer.
 Geir Thoresen, politician.
15 August 
 Frederic Hauge, environmental activist.
 Ove Bernt Trellevik, politician.
16 August – Hanne Dyveke Søttar, politician.
17 August – Per Joar Hansen, footballer.
18 August – Jørgen Langhelle, actor (died 2021).
24 August – Gro Skartveit, politician.
25 August – Tore Øvrebø, rower.
27 August – André N. Skjelstad, politician.
28 August – Olav Akselsen, politician (died 2021).
29 August – Geir-Inge Sivertsen, engineer and politician.

September 
 

6 September – Solveig Pedersen, cross-sountry skier.
13 September – Alexandra Bech Gjørv, lawyer and businesswoman.
15 September – Frank Willy Larsen, politician.
20 September – Ellen Arnstad, editor.
25 September 
 Børge Brende, politician.
 Jan Erik Fåne, politician.
29 September – Nikolaj Frobenius, novelist and screenwriter.

October 
 

12 Otober – Jan-Erick Olsen, swimmer.
13 October – Erlend Larsen, politician.
16 October – Espen Egil Hansen, newspaper editor and publisher.
20 October – Sollaug Sárgon, poet.

November 
 

8 November – Mini Jakobsen, footballer.
11 November – Kåre Ingebrigtsen, footballer.
18 November – Martin Friis, ice hockey player.
20 November – Sissel Knutsen Hegdal, politician.
24 November – Lars Rønningen, wrestler.
30 November 
 Wenche Olsen, politician.
 Morten Strøksnes, journalist and non-fiction writer.

December 
 

19 December – Iren Reppen, actress.
21 December – Frank Rossavik, journalist and non-fiction writer.
24 December – Steinulf Tungesvik, jurist and politician.
27 December – Åsleik Engmark, comedian and actor (died 2017).
31 December – Maria Sødahl, film director and screenwriter.

Full date missing
 Johannes Hjellbrekke, sociologist
 Geir Lysne, jazz musician.
 Cathrine Rasmussen, businesswoman and equestrian.

Notable deaths

4 January – Ragnvald Winjum, jurist and politician (b. 1917).
7 January – Arthur Nordlie, politician (b. 1883). 
9 January – Ole Bergesen, politician (b. 1916)
9 January – Erik Haugland, painter and sculptor (b. 1894).
11 January – Arne Bjørndal, fiddler (b. 1882). 

1 February – Einar Berntsen, speed skater and yacht racer (b. 1891).
1 February – Johan Scharffenberg, physician and writer (b. 1869).
2 February – Rolf Johannessen, footballer (b. 1910).
5 February – Rolf Lefdahl, gymnast (b. 1882).
6 February – Bjarne Henry Henriksen, politician (b. 1904).
18 February – Ragnar Hargreaves, yacht racer (b. 1907).
21 February – Aage Rosenqvist Pran, military officer (b. 1899).
22 February – Nanna With, editor and publisher (b. 1874).
23 February – Johannes Hygen, dean (b. 1876).

1 March – Edvard Welle-Strand, journalist (b. 1884).
3 March – Per Krohg, artist (b. 1889).
9 March – Torvald Haavardstad, politician (b. 1893).
10 March – Hans Gabrielsen, county governor (b. 1891).
14 March – Johan Beronka, priest and writer (b. 1885).
22 March – Herbrand Lavik, theatre critic and writer (b. 1901).

2 April – Jens Hundseid, Prime Minister (b. 1883).
3 April – Gudbrand Skatteboe, sport shooter (b. 1875).
15 April – Lauritz Bergendahl, Nordic combined skier (b. 1887).
19 April – Olaf Lange, painter and graphic designer (b. 1875).
23 April – Haldor Andreas Haldorsen, politician and industrialist (b. 1883).
28 April – Ingvald Møllerstad, photographer (b. 1893).
29 April – Finn Münster, gymnast (b. 1887).

6 May – Jens Bache-Wiig, industrialist (b. 1880).
7 May – Alf Bjørnskau Bastiansen, priest and politician (b. 1883).
15 May – Olav Skard, horticulturalist (b. 1881).
15 May – Hans Beyer, gymnast (b. 1889).
23 May – Helge Klæstad, Supreme Court justice (b. 1885).
25 May – Nils Tvedt, sport diver (b. 1883).

3 June – Hjalmar Riiser-Larsen, aviator, polar explorer and businessman (b. 1890, died in Denmark).
4 June – Sigmund Mowinckel, theologian (b. 1884).
16 June – Agnes Steineger, painter (b. 1863).
17 June – Thor Ørvig, sailor (b. 1891).

4 July – Hans Aasnæs, sport shooter (b. 1902).
10 July – Berge Sigval Natanael Bergesen, ship-owner (b. 1914).
11 July – Harald Johansen, footballer (b. 1887).
12 July – Sverre Reiten, politician (b. 1891).
13 July – Frithjof Lorentzen, fencer (b. 1896).
15 July – Einar Eriksen, rower (b. 1865).
17 July – Olliver Smith, modern pentathlete (b. 1898).
21 July – Robert Sjursen, gymnast (b. 1891).
21 July – Thor Martin Nilsen Sauvik, politician (b. 1889).
22 July – Kristoffer Skåne Grytnes, politician (b. 1887).
27 July – Gustav Natvig-Pedersen, politician (b. 1893).
30 July – Eivind Petershagen, politician (b. 1888).

6 August – Aksel Sandemose, novelist (b. 1899, died in Denmark).
8 August – Kristian Alfred Hammer, politician (b.1898)
11 August – Harald Halvorsen, gymnast (b. 1878).
16 August – Olav Hoprekstad, writer and language activist (b. 1875).
27 August – Karl Hansen, cyclist (b. 1902).

7 September – Oscar Fonbæk, athlete (b. 1887).
12 September – Elling Rønes, cross-country skier (b. 1882).
21 September – Thorstein Stryken, cyclist (b. 1900).

12 October – Alf Sommerfelt, linguist (b. 1892).
13 October – Andreas Honerød, politician (b.1905)
21 October – Karl Johan Pettersen Vadøy, politician (b.1878)
24 October – Trygve Thorsen, sculptor (b. 1892).
25 October – Sivert Aklestad, lyricist (b. 1889).
28 October – Egil Hylleraas, nuclear physicist (b. 1898).

13 November – Odd Borg, actor (b. 1931).
20 November – Per Jordbakke, yacht racer (b. 1932).
28 November – Aslaug Vaa, poet and playwright (b. 1889).

6 December – Wilhelm Rasmussen, sculptor (b. 1879).
9 December – Rasmus Andreas Torset, politician (b.1897)
10 December – Lars Christensen, ship-owner and whaling magnate (b. 1884).
12 December – Halvdan Koht, historian and politician (b. 1873).
16 December – Helen Upsaker, politician (b. 1896).
18 December – Aani Aanisson Rysstad, politician (b.1894)
18 December – Wilhelm Munthe, librarian (b. 1883).
20 December – Halvdan Wexelsen Freihow, theologian (b. 1883).
23 December – Carl Marstrander, linguist (b. 1883).

Full date unknown
Gunnar Brøvig, politician (b.1924)

See also

References

External links